The 1997 Brickyard 400, the 4th running of the event, was a NASCAR Winston Cup Series race held on August 2, 1997 at Indianapolis Motor Speedway in Speedway, Indiana. Contested at 160 laps on the 2.5 mile (4.023 km) speedway, it was the 19th race of the 1997 NASCAR Winston Cup Series season. Ricky Rudd won the race.

Background
The Indianapolis Motor Speedway, located in Speedway, Indiana, (an enclave suburb of Indianapolis) in the United States, is the home of the Indianapolis 500 and the Brickyard 400. The track's turns are banked at 9 degrees, while the front stretch, the location of the finish line, has no banking. The back stretch, opposite of the front, also has a zero degree banking. The racetrack has seats for more than 250,000 spectators.

Summary
In the final twenty laps, Dale Jarrett, Jeff Gordon, and Mark Martin held the top three spots, but none of the three would be able to make it to the finish without one final pit stop for fuel. Jeff Burton and Ricky Rudd also were close on fuel. On lap 145, Robby Gordon brushed the wall, and Burton ran over debris. Burton was forced to pit under green, but as he was finishing his stop, the caution came out. Burton flew out of the pits to beat the leaders, and for a moment it appeared he was in the cat bird's seat with four fresh tires, and would be the leader after all other drivers cycled through their stops. However, he was penalized for speeding while exiting the pit lane, and dropped to 15th. Ricky Rudd was among a few drivers who stayed out, and his gamble put him in the lead. Rudd drove the final 46 laps without a pit stop to take the victory.

Top 10 results

Race statistics
 Time of race: 3:03:28
 Average Speed: 
 Pole Speed: 177.736
 Cautions: 6 for 25 laps
 Margin of Victory: 0.183 sec
 Lead changes: 19
 Percent of race run under caution: 15.6%         
 Average green flag run: 19.3 laps

Brickyard 400
Brickyard 400
NASCAR races at Indianapolis Motor Speedway